E. Marlitt is the pseudonym of Eugenie John (December 5, 18251887), a popular German novelist.

Biography
She was born at Arnstadt.

She became deaf, and returned to Sondershausen, living for 11 years at court as a companion to her patroness. Her correspondents were struck with her attractive style, and encouraged her to write novels. For this purpose, she returned to Arnstadt in 1863, and there began her career as a novelist. She used her experiences at court and as a travelling companion to the princess as material for her books, which were primarily directed against social prejudice.

Works
 Die zwölf Apostel (1865) This is her first novel. It appeared in the Leipzig Gartenlaube.
 Goldelse (1866) This novel marked the beginning of her celebrity, its readers attracted by its graphic and poetic delineations of German life.
 Blaubart (1866)
 Das Geheimnis der alten Mamsell (1868)
 Thüringer Erzählungen (1869)
 Reichsgräfin Gisela (1870)
 Heideprinzeßchen (1872)
 Die zweite Frau (1874)
These novels were made available in English translations by Annis Lee Wister of Philadelphia. Marlitt's collected works appeared in 10 volumes (Leipzig, 1888–90; second edition, 1891-94).

Marlitt published several works in the German weekly magazine Die Gartenlaube (such as Reichsgräfin Gisela in 1869).

Selected filmography 
Das Geheimnis der alten Mamsell (1917)
Im Hause des Kommerzienrates (1917)
Die Frau mit den Karfunkelsteinen (1917)
Die zweite Frau (1918)
Old Mamsell's Secret (1925)
El secreto de la solterona (Mexico, 1945)
 (1972, TV film)
 (1973, TV film)
Im Hause des Kommerzienrates (1975, TV film)
 (1983, TV film)
Die Frau mit den Karfunkelsteinen (1985, TV film)

Notes

References

External links

 
 
 "Reichsgräfin Gisela" in Die Gartenlaube, January 1869, Wikimedia Commons, webpage: R.Gisela.

1825 births
1887 deaths
German women novelists
19th-century German novelists
19th-century German women writers